This list of major Japanese institutions covers government and some private institutions and businesses, for the period 1930 to August 1945.

Japanese Central Government

Imperial affairs
Imperial Household Ministry
Privy Council (Japan)
Lord Keeper of the Privy Seal of Japan

Legislature
Diet of Japan 
House of Peers
House of Representatives of Japan
Imperial Rule Assistance Association

Cabinet
Prime Minister of Japan
Ministry of War of Japan 
Ministry of the Navy of Japan 
Munitions Ministry (Japan)
Ministry of Education, Science and Culture (Japan)
Ministry of Welfare (Japan)
Foreign Affairs Ministry
Ministry of Economy, Trade and Industry 
Ministry of Finance (Japan)
Ministry of Agriculture, Forestry and Fisheries (Japan)
Railway Ministry (Japan)
Home Ministry 
Ministry of Justice (Japan) 
Ministry of Posts and Telecommunications (Japan)
Governor-General of Korea
Governor-General of Taiwan
Governor-General of Kwantung
Ministry of Colonial Affairs (Japan)
Ministry of Greater East Asia
South Seas Mandate
Governor of the South Seas Mandate

Judicial
Supreme Court of Judicature of Japan
Tokyo High Court
Tokyo District Court

National security institutions
Imperial General Headquarters 
Supreme War Council (Japan)
Imperial Japanese Army General Staff Office
Imperial Japanese Army 
Kwantung Army
Imperial Japanese Army Academy
Army War College (Japan) 
Imperial Japanese Navy 
Imperial Japanese Navy General Staff 
Imperial Japanese Navy Academy
Naval War College (Japan)
Imperial Guard of Japan 
Inspectorate General of Military Training 
Kempeitai (Army Military Police)
Tokkeitai (Navy Military Police)
Tokko
Keishicho 
Koban (police box)
Inspectorate General of Aviation 
Tachikawa Army Arsenal
Sagami Army Arsenal
Osaka Army Arsenal
Yokosuka Naval Arsenal
Omura Naval Arsenal
Koza Naval Arsenal
Kasumigara Naval Arsenal
Aomori Naval Arsenal

Political organizations related to government
Tonarigumi
Imperial Youth Federation
Imperial Youth Corps 
Imperial Volunteer Corps 
Nation Service Society 
National Spiritual Mobilization Movement
Showa Kenkyukai

Informative government agencies
Domei-Tsushin Press Agency
Radio Tokyo

Other associations and groups 
Japan Olympic Association
Japanese Red Cross
Boy Scouts of Nippon

Newspapers
Asahi Shimbun
Chunichi Shimbun
Hokkaido Shimbun
Japan Times 
Tokyo Nichi Nichi Shimbun
Osaka Mainichi Shimbun
Hochi Shimbun
Nihon Keizai Shimbun
Nikkan Kogyo Shimbun
Nishinippon Shimbun
Sankei Shimbun
Tokyo Shimbun
Yomiuri Shimbun

Educational institutions
National school public system (Kokumin Gakkou) 
Imperial university system 
Tokyo Imperial University
Kyoto Imperial University
Osaka Imperial University
Nagoya Imperial University
Kyushu Imperial University
Hokkaido Imperial University
Keijo Imperial University
Taihoku Imperial University 
Gakushuin Peers School

Scientific research
 RIKEN

Official Religious institutions
State Shinto 
Yasukuni Jinja

Nationalized businesses
Bank of Chosen 
Bank of Taiwan 
Central Bank of Manchou
 Chosen Railway Company
 East Asia Travel Corporation
East Chinese Railway
Imperial Japanese Airways
Karafuto Mining and Railway Company
Manchurian Industrial Development Company
Manshukoku Hikoki Seizo KK
Manshukoku Koku KK
Nanyo Kohatsu Kabushiki Kaisha (South Seas Development Company)
Yawata Iron & Steel Company 
Nippon Yusen
Showa Steel Works
South Manchuria Railway
Taiwan Takushoku Kabushiki Kaisha

Private nationalist organizations
Aikoku Kinroto (The Patriotic Labor Party) 
Aikoku Seiji Domei (Patriotic Government League) 
Aikoku Taishu-to (Patriotic Mass Party)
Aikyojuku (Native-Land-Loving School)
Bokyoteishintai (Devoted Squad Defending Against Communism)
Dai Nippon Sekisei-kai (Great Japan Sincerity Association) 
Dai Nippon Kokusai (Great Japan Spirit or Essence Society)
Dai Nippon Seigi-dan (Great Japan Justice Society) 
Dai Nippon Seinen-to (Great Japan Youth Party) 
Dai Nippon Seisanto (Japan Production Party) 
Daiko-sha (Great Work Society or Great Unification Society)  
Dobunkai
Dokuritsu Seinen Sha (Independence Youth Society)
Futabakai( Futabakai)
Genyosha/(Black Ocean Society)
Goko-kai (Society for Protection of the Emperor)
Gyochisa (The Society of Action) 
Hoirusha Kai (Military Service Man's League) 
Jinmmu Kai (Jimmu Society)
Kakusei-kai
Kaigun Kyokai (Navy League)
Kakumeiso (Society of the Cry of the Crane) 
Kanzan So (The Mountain of Sweat Society) 
Kayosha (National Assembly Pressure Group) 
Kenki-kai (Imperial Flag Society)
Kenkokukai (Society for the Foundation of the State)
Ketsumeidan (Blood Brotherhood)
Kokumin Domei (National Alliance) 
Kokuryu-kai/Black Dragon Society
Roninkai (Black Dragon Society intelligence branch in Mongolia, 1908)
Yurinkai (Black Dragon Society section for supporting Sun Yat-Sen in China)
Yuzonsha
Kokkyo Semmei-dan (National Principle Society)
Kokka Shakai Shugi Gakumei (The National Socialist League)
Kokuhonsha (Basis of the Country Society or The National Foundations Society), 
Kokuikai (The Society for the Maintenance of National Prestige) 
Meikoku-kai (Illustrious Virtue Society)
Naichi-Gaiko-Sakushin Domei (League for the Improvement of Administration and Diplomacy)
Nihon Kokusui Kai (Japanese Patriotic Society)
Minami no kai(Society of the South)
Nomin Kesshitai (The Death Defying Farmers' Band) 
Sakurakai (Cherry Blossom Society)
San Roku Kurabu (The '36 Club) 
Sekka Boshidan (Anti-Red League)
Tenketo Kai (Heaven Spade Party)
Tenyukyo (Society of the Celestial Salvation of the Oppressed, a Genyosha subordinate group)
Tohokai (Far East Society)
Yamato Minro-kai (Japanese National Society)

See also
List of Japanese political figures in early Showa period

Japanese militarism
Empire of Japan
Institutions (1930-1945)
Institutions (1930-1945)